Peter David Hancock (11 November 1931 – 17 May 2020) was an Australian rules footballer who played with Hawthorn in the Victorian Football League (VFL).

Notes

External links 

1931 births
Australian rules footballers from Victoria (Australia)
Hawthorn Football Club players
2020 deaths